Antoni Madaliński - Polish Lieutenant General
 Jan Madaliński - Roman Catholic prelate